Grosvenor Island is one of the Canadian arctic islands in Nunavut, Canada. It lies in the Arctic Ocean, south-east of Edmund Walker Island and north-west of Patterson Island. It is part of the Findlay Group.

External links
 Grosvenor Island in the Atlas of Canada - Toporama; Natural Resources Canada

Islands of the Queen Elizabeth Islands
Uninhabited islands of Qikiqtaaluk Region